Hydroxy-alpha-sanshool is a molecule found in plants from the genus Zanthoxylum.
It is believed to be responsible for the numbing and tingling sensation caused by eating food cooked with Sichuan peppercorns and Uzazi.

The term sanshool in the compound's name is derived from the Japanese term for the Japanese pepper,  (literally, mountain pepper), to which was appended the suffix -ol, indicating an alcohol.

Mechanism

The chemical structure of hydroxy-alpha-sanshool is similar to that of capsaicin, but the mechanism of action by which it induces nerve sensations has been a matter of debate. Although the compound is an agonist at the pain integration channels TRPV1 and TRPA1 like capsaicin, newer evidence suggests that the tandem pore domain potassium channels KCNK3, KCNK9, and KCNK18 are primarily responsible for sanshool's effects.

Hydroxy-alpha sanshool excites D-hair afferent nerve fibers, a distinct subset of the sensitive light touch receptors in the skin, and targets novel populations of Aβ and C-fiber nerve fibers.

Extraction 
To isolate the molecule from the pepper in form of an extract, steam distillation can be used: Dried peels
of the fruit are immersed in a mixture of lower alcohols (for example ethanol) and water with a mass
percentage between 35% and 65% of the alcohol. The solution gets heated up in the process of steam
distillation where the aqueous part evaporates and takes parts of the hydroxy-alpha- sanshool up, too.
The distillate separates in two phases: the aqueous ethanol phase and the oil phase which contains the
desired molecule.

Steam distillation extraction methods demonstrate yields of approximately 60%.

See also 
 Spilanthol

References 

Fatty acid amides
Tertiary alcohols
Polyenes